The American linguist Joseph Greenberg (1915–2001) proposed a set of linguistic universals based primarily on a set of 30 languages.  The following list is verbatim from the list printed in the appendix of Greenberg's Universals of Language and "Universals Restated", sorted by context.

The numbering is fixed to keep Greenberg's number associations, as these are commonly referenced by number, for example "Greenberg's linguistic universal number 12."

Typology

 "In declarative sentences with nominal subject and object, the dominant order is almost always one in which the subject precedes the object."
 "In languages with prepositions, the genitive almost always follows the governing noun, while in languages with postpositions it almost always precedes."
 "Languages with dominant VSO order are always prepositional."
 "With overwhelmingly greater than chance frequency, languages with normal SOV order are postpositional."
 "If a language has dominant SOV order and the genitive follows the governing noun, then the adjective likewise follows the noun."
 "All languages with dominant VSO order have SVO as an alternative or as the only alternative basic order."

Syntax

Morphology

References 

Linguistics lists
Linguistic universals